The Polish Socialist Party (PPS) is a socialist political party in Poland.

It was one of the most important parties in Poland from its inception in 1892 until its merger with the communist Polish Workers' Party to form the Polish United Workers' Party in 1948. Józef Piłsudski, founder of the Second Polish Republic, belonged to and later led the PPS in the early 20th century.

The party was re-established in 1987, near the end of the Polish People's Republic. However, it remained in the margins of Polish politics until 2019, when it was able to win a seat in the Senate of Poland.

History
The PPS was founded in Paris in 1892 (see the Great Emigration). In 1893 the party called Social Democracy of the Kingdom of Poland and Lithuania, (SDKPiL), emerged from the PPS, with the PPS being more nationalist and oriented towards Polish independence, and the SDKPiL being more revolutionary and communist. In November 1892 the leading personalities of the PPS agreed on a political program. The program, largely progressive for the time of its creation, accented: independent Republic of Poland based on democratic principles, direct universal voting rights, equal rights for all nations living in Poland, equal rights for all citizens, regardless of race, nationality, religion and gender, freedom of press, speech, and assembly, progressive taxation, eight-hour workday, minimum wage, equal wages for men and women, ban on child labour (till age 14), free education, and social support in case of injury in the workplace.

After the Revolution of 1905 in the Russian Empire, the party membership drastically increased from several hundred active members to a mass movement of about 60,000 members. Another split in the party occurred in 1906, with the Revolutionary Faction following Józef Piłsudski, who supported the nationalist and independence ideals, and the Left faction which allied itself with the SDKPiL. However, the Revolutionary Faction became dominant and renamed itself back again to the PPS, while the Left was eclipsed, and in 1918 merged with SDKPiL forming the Communist Party of Poland. In 1917-18 the party participated in the Central Council of Ukraine and the Government of Ukraine.

During the Second Polish Republic the PPS at first supported Józef Piłsudski, including his May Coup, but later moved into the opposition to his authoritarian Sanacja regime by joining the democratic 'centrolew' (center-left) opposition movement. Many PPS leaders and members were put on trial by Piłsudski's regime and jailed in the infamous Bereza Kartuska prison.

The party was a member of the Labour and Socialist International between 1923 and 1940.

The party supported the Polish resistance during  as the underground Polish Socialist Party – Freedom, Equality, Independence (Polska Partia Socjalistyczna – Wolność, Równość, Niepodległość). In 1948 it suffered a fatal split, as the Communists applied the salami tactics to dismember any opposition. One faction, which included Edward Osóbka-Morawski wanted to join forces with the Polish Peasant Party and form a united front against the Communists. Another faction, led by Józef Cyrankiewicz, argued that the Socialists should support the Communists in carrying through a socialist program while opposing the imposition of one-party rule. Pre-war political hostilities continued to influence events, and Stanisław Mikołajczyk, leader of the Peasant Party, would not agree to form a united front with the Socialists. The Communists played on these divisions by dismissing Osóbka-Morawski and making Cyrankiewicz Prime Minister.

In 1948, Cyrankiewicz's faction of Socialists merged with the Communist Polish Workers' Party (PPR) to form the Polish United Workers' Party (Polska Zjednoczona Partia Robotnicza; PZPR), the ruling party in the People's Republic of Poland; remnants of the other faction survived on emigration in the Polish government-in-exile and because of that Polish Socialist Party was still active on emigration. Cyrankiewicz's faction isn't really treated as proper PPS.

A new party of the same name, which seeks to carry on the tradition of the original PPS, was established by left-wing opposition figures such as Jan Józef Lipski in 1987. However, the new PPS remains a marginal group within the political landscape of the Third Republic, having representation in the Sejm only between 1993 and 2001. However, in the 2019 Polish parliamentary election the PPS saw its leader Wojciech Konieczny elected to the Senate of Poland under the banner of The Left. Other members of the Sejm and the Senate later joined the PPS, which currently has two deputies and two senators.

Its main propaganda outlet was the Robotnik ('The Worker') newspaper. The current party published the Nowy Robotnik ("The New Worker"), a continuation of the original publication, from 2003 to 2006.

On 16 November 2020, the party founded its first foreign branch in the United Kingdom, in the city of Coventry, home to a British Polish population founded by Polish Army Exiles.

On the 25 June 2022, the party formed an alliance with the Labour Union, Social Democracy of Poland and Freedom and Equality, to compete in the next Polish parliamentary election. The alliance also includes the Feminist Initiative, the Democratic Left Association (SLD), and the Working People's Movement.

Ideology 
It historically advocated a mix of socialism and nationalism, and was considered to be on the left-wing on the political spectrum. They opposed Bolshevism, and more favored Mensheviks. Recently the party has self-declared itself as a democratic socialist force, and was described as a leftist party with a strong emphasis on democracy by their parliamentary leader Wojciech Konieczny.

Election results

Sejm

Senate

Presidential

European Parliament

Notable people who were members or were associated with PPS

Presidents and heads of state
Józef Piłsudski (former member at time in office)
Stanisław Wojciechowski (former member)
Ignacy Mościcki (former member)
Stanisław Ostrowski
Franciszek Trąbalski

Prime Ministers
Ignacy Daszyński
Jędrzej Moraczewski
Janusz Jędrzejewicz (former member)
Walery Sławek (former member)
Tomasz Arciszewski
Tadeusz Tomaszewski
Antoni Pająk
Alfred Urbański
Edward Osóbka-Morawski (later became a communist)
Józef Cyrankiewicz (later became a communist)

Other figures
Jan Józef Lipski
Bolesław Limanowski
Adam Ciołkosz

Jerzy Czeszejko-Sochacki (later became a communist)
Norbert Barlicki
Piotr Ikonowicz
Wojciech Konieczny
Jan Kwapiński
Herman Lieberman
Stanisław Mendelson
Stanisław Dubois

Mieczysław Niedziałkowski

Zofia Praussowa
Kazimierz Pużak
Kazimierz Sosnkowski

Leon Wasilewski
Aleksandra Zagórska

See also
List of Polish Socialist Party politicians
Central Rada
List of anti-capitalist and communist parties with national parliamentary representation

Notes

References

External links
Official website

 
Political parties in Poland